Hum Aapke Hain Koun..! also known by the initialism HAHK, is a 1994 Indian Hindi-language musical romantic drama film written and directed by Sooraj Barjatya and produced by Rajshri Productions. The film stars Madhuri Dixit and Salman Khan and celebrates Indian wedding traditions by means of a story of a married couple and the relationship between their families; a story about sacrificing one's love for one's family. The basic plot is based on studio's earlier film Nadiya Ke Paar (1982), which was based on Keshav Prasad Mishra's Hindi novel Kohbar Ki Shart. The film features music by Raamlaxman who also composed a 14-song soundtrack, an unusually large number of songs for that period.

It contributed to a change in the Indian film industry, with new methods of distribution and a turn towards less violent stories. Box Office India described it as "the biggest blockbuster of the modern era." It received widespread critical acclaim upon release, with high praise for its direction, story, screenplay, dialogues, soundtrack, production design, costumes and performances of the cast, with major praise directed towards Dixit's performance.

At the 42nd National Film Awards, Hum Aapke Hain Koun..! won two awards, including the Best Popular Film Providing Wholesome Entertainment. At the 40th Filmfare Awards, the film received a leading 13 nominations, including Best Actor (Khan), Best Supporting Actor (for both Kher and Behl) and Best Supporting Actress (for both Lagoo and Shahane), and won 5 awards, including Best Film, Best Director (Barjatya), Best Actress (Dixit) and Special Award (Lata Mangeshkar for "Didi Tera Devar Deewana"). It also won major awards at the newly-introduced Screen Awards, where it won 6 awards.

Hum Aapke Hain Koun..! is considered as one of the most influential film in the Indian film industry as well as in pop culture. It made a lasting impact on wedding celebrations in India, which often include songs and games from the film. It is credited as being a defining moment in Hindi cinema's box office history, and the beginning of a revolution in the Indian film distribution system.

Plot 
Orphaned brothers Prem and Rajesh live with their uncle Kailashnath. Rajesh manages the family business and his family is on the look-out for a suitable bride for him. One day, Kailashnath meets his college friend, Siddharth Chaudhary, who is now a professor, after several years. Siddharth and his wife Madhukala have two daughters named Pooja and Nisha. Siddharth and Kailashnath arrange marriage between Rajesh and Pooja. From their first meeting, Nisha and Prem start bickering lightheartedly with each other and the fun and mischief continue throughout Pooja and Rajesh's wedding.

Prem has an amicable relationship with Rajesh’s warm-hearted sister-in-law Nisha. In time, Pooja and Rajesh realise their love for each other and it is revealed that Pooja is expecting a child. Siddharth and Madhukala are unable to come to Kailashnath's house for the ceremony marking the impending arrival of the baby. They send Nisha instead, who is present at the birth. Meanwhile, Nisha and Prem fall in love with each other, but keep it a secret. Siddharth and Madhukala come over to Kailashnath's house to celebrate the birth of their grandchild. When the time comes to part, their hosts are dejected, especially Prem. He and Nisha promise each other that they will soon reunite forever.

Pooja is invited to stay at her parents' house and Prem takes her there. When they arrive, Pooja learns that Prem and Nisha are in love and gives Nisha a necklace as a token, promising to get them married. Shortly afterward, Pooja accidentally slips, falling down from the stairs, and eventually dies from a head injury. Everybody is shattered by the tragedy.

Nisha takes good care of Pooja and Rajesh's son. Hence, Siddharth and Kailashnath feel that Nisha will be a great mother to the baby. They decide to have Nisha marry Rajesh. Nisha overhears Siddharth and Madhukala talking about her marriage into Kailashnath's family and thinks that they are discussing her marriage to Prem, to which she agrees. Later, at a pre-nuptial ceremony, she finds out that she is actually going to marry Rajesh.

Prem and Nisha vow to sacrifice their love for Rajesh and the son. Moments before the wedding, Nisha asks Prem's dog Tuffy to give Prem the necklace that Pooja had given her, along with a letter. Tuffy exits Nisha's room and instead of taking the letter to Prem, delivers it to Rajesh. Rajesh reads the letter and realises that Prem and Nisha love each other. Subsequently, he halts the wedding and confronts both Nisha and Prem. In the end, Nisha and Prem marry each other with the consent of their families.

Cast 
 Madhuri Dixit as Nisha Choudhury
 Salman Khan as Prem Bhat
 Mohnish Bahl as Rajesh Gautam Bhat
 Renuka Shahane as Pooja Choudhury
 Alok Nath as Kailashnath Bhat
 Reema Lagoo as Madhukala Choudhury
 Anupam Kher as Professor Siddharth Choudhury
 Satish Shah as Dr. Amit Sharma
 Himani Shivpuri as Dr. Razia "Razal" Sharma
 Dilip Joshi as Bhola Prasad
 Laxmikant Berde as Lallu Prasad
 Priya Arun as Chameli
 Redo as Tuffy
 Ajit Vachani as Professor Mahendra Kashyap
 Bindu as Bhagwanti Kashyap
 Sahila Chadha as Rita
 Dinesh Hingoo as Manager Chacha

Production 
Director/writer Sooraj Barjatya devoted one year and nine months to write the screenplay of Hum Aapke Hain Koun..!. He spent the first five months trying to write another Maine Pyar Kiya, but then started over after his father Rajkumar Barjatya suggested that he rework one of the family company Rajshri Productions earlier offerings. Hum Aapke Hain Koun..! then became a loose adaptation of their 1982 production Nadiya Ke Paar. Barjatya used musical numbers to avoid treating some situations in a cliché manner, which resulted in so many songs that there were complaints during initial screenings of the film concerning its length and number of songs. Barjayta's grandfather, company founder Tarachand Barjatya, loved the song "Dhiktana" so much that the film was nearly given that title. Barjatya later told India Abroad, "My attempt in this movie has been to re-expose the cinema-going public to the quintessential family life... not to make people feel that they have come to see a movie, but make them feel as if they have come to visit a big joint family that is preparing for a wedding". The story was constructed differently than what was popular at the time. There were no villains, violence, or battles between good and evil. From conception to finished product, the film took four years.

Aamir Khan was initially offered the role of Prem, but he declined the offer due to being dissatisfied with the script. It then went to Salman Khan.

The producers/distributors exercised a higher than normal level of control over their work. There was a limited release, a new form of television publicity, safeguards against video piracy, and a delay in the releasing of video tapes.

Music 

The soundtrack for Hum Aapke Hain Koun..! was composed by Raamlaxman (original name Vijay Patil) who had earlier given music for Rajshri's Maine Pyar Kiya, with lyrics by Ravinder Rawal and Dev Kohli. It was produced under the Sa Re Ga Ma label which at that time was known as HMV (short for His Master's Voice) and featured veteran playback singers such as Lata Mangeshkar, S. P. Balasubrahmanyam, Kumar Sanu, Udit Narayan, Shailendra Singh and Sharda Sinha. Raamlaxman had about 50 sessions with the director Barjatya during scripting. The finished soundtrack included an unusually large number of songs at 14 (15, if we count the sad version of the song "Mujhse Juda Hokar" which appears in the movie, but not on the music album), plus the song "Hasta Hua Noorani Chehra" (from the film Parasmani (1963)), that was used when the characters play a game. The track "Didi Tera Devar Deewana" is said to be inspired by Ustad Nusrat Fateh Ali Khan's song "Saare Nabian". The song became one of the most popular film songs ever, and was on the charts for over a year. The soundtrack was highly successful upon release, becoming the highest-selling Bollywood soundtrack of the year, and one of the top sellers of the 1990s, with 12million units sold. It was ranked at number 29 on the list of all-time best-selling Bollywood soundtracks by Planet Bollywood.

Release 
Hum Aapke Hain Koun..! premiered at Liberty Cinema in South Mumbai on 5 August 1994; it eventually ran there for over 100 weeks. The film initially saw a very limited release, also showing at the Regal and Eros theatres, with only 26 prints total. Eventually, it started to appear in many more theatres. When initial viewers complained about the film's length, 2 of the 14 song sequences were removed. These were later restored when film goers were found to enjoy all of the songs. Early reviewers of Hum Aapke Hain Koun..! predicted that it would be a huge flop; hence the industry was stunned when it went on to become the most successful film of all time up to that point.

Reception

Box office 
Hum Aapke Hain Koun..! is one of the biggest grossers ever in the history of Indian cinema, and is said to have changed film business forever in the country. It went on to gross an estimated  in India, making it the first to gross over 1 billion. Box Office India gave it the verdict "All Time Blockbuster", and described it as "the biggest blockbuster of the modern era." Much of the success was due to repeat business. For example, painter M. F. Husain was reported to have seen the film over 60 times. Hum Aapke Hain Koun sold 74million tickets in India, giving it the highest domestic footfalls of any Hindi film released since the 1990s.

The film was also dubbed into the Telugu-language and released with the title Premalayam and was very successful there, running for more than 200 days in theatres. The film earned about  abroad in overseas markets.

Critical reception 
Hum Aapke Hain Koun..! received widespread critical acclaim upon release, with high praise for its direction, screenplay, dialogues, music, production design, costumes and performances of the cast, particularly  Dixit's performance.

India Abroad called it a "cloyingly familial and touchingly sad melodrama replete with typical Indian social situations". Tripat Narayanan of New Straits Times criticised the plot as "paper-thin" and the climax scenes as clichéd, but said Barajiya handled them so well that Shahane's "smiling bride face is immortalised as an epitome of goodness." He appreciated the performances of Dixit and Lagoo, concluding that "what really holds the film together is the editing."

Redo, an Indian Spitz, received favourable recognition as Tuffy the dog. He was included in the "Best Pets in Hindi films" list compiled by Daily News and Analysis. After the film, Redo was reportedly adopted by Dixit.

Accolades 
Hum Aapke Hain Koun..! won the National Film Award for Best Popular Film Providing Wholesome Entertainment. The film received a leading 13 nominations at the 40th Filmfare Awards, and won 5 awards including Best Film, Best Director, and Best Actress, making it one of the biggest winners of the year. Lata Mangeshkar, who sang more than 10 songs in the film, had long retired from accepting awards, but the public demand for the song "Didi Tera Devar Deewana" was such that she received the Filmfare Special Award that year. The film also won major awards at the newly-introduced Screen Awards, where it won six awards.

Analysis 
Author Kovid Gupta classified Hum Aapke Hain Koun..! as a film that bridges the gap between traditionalism and modernity. He discussed the songs of the films in particular, and the "manifestation of romance under the acceptance and blessings of the family, in specific, the elder sister-in-law". Patricia Uberoi called the film a family film in two ways; it is about family relationships, and it is suitable for the entire family to watch. She said that the film is not about the two leads, but about the family, an ideal family. Tejaswini Ganti has called the film a "paean to filial duty" for how the children are willing to sacrifice their love for the good of their families. The family relationships are also noted for being different from the normal cinematic families of the time due to their mutual civility. Rediff.com noted that "Though the film was initially dismissed as a wedding video, its success indicated that post-liberalisation, Indian audiences still clung to the comfort of the familiar." Jigna Desai said that the film's popularity was due to interactions of the families around the traditional folk wedding practices. In his study on the response to the film, academic Vamsee Juluri concluded that the celebration of the family is HAHK'''s "most useful contribution to history".

 Legacy and influence Hum Aapke Hain Koun..! is credited as being a defining moment in Hindi cinema's box office history, and the beginning of a revolution in the Indian film distribution system. When it was released, cinema was in decline in India due to improved cable television, home video, and film piracy. The film was originally released in only a small number of theatres that agreed to upgrade their facilities. Due to widespread demand for the film, many other theatres upgraded in order to get the film. Although ticket prices were raised, the upgraded theatres brought people back who had been lost to television. Also, the film's lack of vulgarity was a sign to middle-class family patrons that they could return to the theatre. This film, in addition to the following year's Dilwale Dulhania Le Jayenge, contributed to an increase in Indian cinema attendance of 40% in just two years.

The film was so successful that it literally gave the term blockbuster new meaning in India. Box Office India said, "Hum Aapke Hain Koun..! [...] took business for films released afterwards to another level. To put into perspective how business changed [...] before Hum Aapke Hain Koun..! an all India share of 10 crore for a big film was regarded as blockbuster business but after Hum Aapke Hain Koun..! the blockbuster business figure went to 20 crore."Hum Aapke Hain Koun..! influenced many subsequent Hindi films. The film was also a trendsetter for glamorous family dramas and NRI-related films, and started Bollywood's "big-fat-wedding-film" trend. In 1998 a theatre company in London, where the film had played for a year, staged a production based on the film titled Fourteen Songs, Two Weddings and a Funeral. Planet Bollywood has noted that no wedding is complete without some songs from this film, and it has been used as a script to design wedding plans. For years afterwards, women wanted to wear a purple sari like the one worn by Madhuri Dixit in the song "Didi Tera Devar Deewana".

It also influenced many filmmakers such as Aditya Chopra and Karan Johar. Karan Johar named it as the one film that changed his life. He said, "After seeing Hum Aapke Hain Koun..! I realized Indian cinema is about values, tradition, subtlety, romance. There is so much soul in it. [...] I decided to go ahead and be a filmmaker only after watching this film." Hum Aapke Hain Koun..! belongs to a small collection of films, including Kismet (1943), Mother India (1957), Mughal-e-Azam (1960) and Sholay (1975), which are repeatedly watched throughout India and are viewed as definitive Hindi films with cultural significance.

On April 24, 2021, production house, Rashmi Sharma Telefilms, announced that they would be remaking the film version into a show version which will air on StarPlus and Hotstar soon. She announced that the storyline will be the same as the film version.

 Footnotes 

 References 

 Bibliography 

 External links 
 Official site at Rajshri Productions
 
 
 
 
 Hum Aapke Hain Koun..! at Bollywood Hungama
 Hum Aapke Hain Koun..!: An Example of the Coding of Emotions in Contemporary Hindi Mainstream Film Projections Issue 2 editorial by Alexandra Schneider
 The Families Of Hindi Cinema: A Socio-Historical Approach To Film Studies Framework'' Issue 42 editorial by Valentina Vitali

1990s Hindi-language films
1990s romantic comedy-drama films
1990s romantic musical films
1994 films
1994 romantic comedy films
1994 romantic drama films
Best Popular Film Providing Wholesome Entertainment National Film Award winners
Films about dogs
Films about families
Films about Indian weddings
Films about pets
Films based on Indian novels
Films directed by Sooraj Barjatya
Films featuring a Best Choreography National Film Award-winning choreography
Films scored by Raamlaxman
Films shot in Ooty
Indian romantic comedy-drama films
Indian romantic musical films
Rajshri Productions films
Remakes of Indian films